Bapu Chandrasen Kamble (15 July 1919 – 6 November 2006) was an Indian politician, writer, editor, jurist, and social activist. He is also an Ambedkarite thinker, translator and biographer. Kamble is the leader of Republican Party of India (Kamble). He is from Maharashtra. He has written a Marathi biography of B. R. Ambedkar called "Samagra Ambedkar Charitra" (Vol. 1–24).

Kamble helped Dr. Babasaheb Ambedkar while drafting the Constitution of India. For nearly 50 years after Ambedkar's death, Kamble led the Republican Party of India. After the death of Babasaheb, there was a split in the Republican Party of India. He is the president of a group, Republican Party of India (Kamble).

Journalism and educational career 
Dr. Babasaheb Ambedkar started a Satyagraha demanding the cancellation of the Poona Pact in Pune on 18 July 1946, because the Cabinet Mission to India rejected the independent political existence of untouchables in 1946. This is called 'Pune Satyagraha'. For support this Satyagraha, student Kamble wrote an article Dalit Satyagrahinchi Kaifiyat (the Pleading of the Dalit Satyagrahies) in Kirloskar, a leading journal at that time. This article was published in the November 1946 issue of 'Kirloskar'. After that, Ambedkar himself read the article and appointed him as editor of Janata weekly. From 1948 to 1954, Kamble served as the editor of the Janata weekly. From 1956 to 1958, he served as the editor of the Prabuddha Bharat weekly. From 1959 to 1975, he served as the editor of the Republic weekly. The Janata and the Prabuddha Bharat were started by Dr. Babasaheb Ambedkar. Kamble followed Ambedkar. Due to the influence of Ambedkar, he converted to Buddhism in 1956. During 1956–57, he served as a Professor of Constitutional Law in Siddharth College of Law, Mumbai.

Political career 

In 1952 Bombay Legislative Assembly election, Kamble was the MLA of the Scheduled Caste Federation party in the Bombay Legislative Assembly from 1952 to 1957. During this time, he fought alone on the issue of "Samyukta Maharashtra" (United Maharashtra) in the legislature. He was twice a member of the Republican Party of India in the Lok Sabha from 1957 to 1962 and 1977 to 1979. In the parliament, he opposed the Emergency and 44th Amendment of the constitution. He was a wise and learned leader of the Republican Party of India.

Books
List of following Books written by B. C. Kamble:
 Samagra Ambedkar Charitra (Vol. 1–24)
 Asprushya Mulche Kon Ani Te Asprushya Kase Banale? (Marathi translation of The Untouchables: Who Were They are Why The Become Untouchables)
 Aikyach Ka?
 Dr. Babasaheb Ambedkaranche Akherche Sansadiy Vichar (Last thoughts of Dr. Ambedkar on Parliamentary Affairs)
 Raja Milindche Prashna (Questions of kind Milind)
 Legislature Vs. High Court
 Thoughts on 44th Constitution Amendment Bill
 Dr. Ambedkar on Indian Constitution
 Questions of King Milind
 Tripitak (Volume Nos. 1 to 4)
 Dr. Ambedkar as Parliamentarian
 'Last thoughts of Dr. Ambedkar on Parliamentary Affairs Uprooting the famine''

References

1919 births
2006 deaths
Marathi politicians
Republican Party of India politicians
Writers from Mumbai
Marathi-language writers
Scholars from Mumbai
Indian Buddhists
20th-century Buddhists
21st-century Buddhists
Social workers
Social workers from Maharashtra
Converts to Buddhism from Hinduism
Dalit activists
Activists from Maharashtra
20th-century Indian lawyers
21st-century Indian lawyers
20th-century jurists
21st-century jurists
Indian newspaper editors
21st-century Indian politicians
20th-century Indian biographers
21st-century Indian biographers
Lok Sabha members from Maharashtra
India MPs 1957–1962
India MPs 1977–1979
Members of the Maharashtra Legislative Assembly
Bombay State MLAs 1952–1957
Bombay State politicians